Justice Ram Prakash Sethi (7 July 1937 – 17 January 2007) was born in Mirpur, Jammu and Kashmir (present-day Pakistan). He began practicing law in 1961. Sethi was enrolled as Pleader in 1961, as Vakil in 1962, and as Advocate in 1967. He practiced law for 25 years. Before elevation to the Jammu & Kashmir High Court on 30 May 1986, was Special Public Prosecutor for cases under Jammu & Kashmir Enemy Agents Ordinance, appointed Additional Advocate General of Jammu & Kashmir State in 1975 but resigned after nine months. Was the Standing Counsel of various prestigious organizations and institutions such as the University of Jammu, Jammu & Kashmir Financial Corporation, represented State of Jammu & Kashmir in the Supreme Court in the review matter of Keshwanand Bharti's case.

He died on 17 January 2007 at Chandigarh.

Early life

Education
Sethi graduated from Kashmir University in 1959 and LL.B. from Faculty of Law, Aligarh Muslim University, Aligarh in 1961. He was President of the Students Union of the College. Actively participated in the students movement having remained as Secretary General of Jammu and Kashmir Students Federation of India. He was also Secretary of the Debating Society of the College, participated in various debates at the State and national level and won prizes. He also edited the college magazine.

Career

Sethi authored commentaries on the Hindu Marriage Act and was an editor of Urdu weekly Shagaf besides being the Regional Editor of more than twelve law magazines published from various parts of the country.

He was appointed Additional Judge of the Jammu and Kashmir High Court on 30 May 1986 and a permanent Judge on 5 August 1987. He transferred to Punjab & Haryana High Court on 18 October 1993 and was appointed Chief Justice Karnataka High Court on 29 June 1996. Later, he was appointed as a Judge of Supreme Court of India on 8 January 1999. Sethi retired on 7 July 2002.

Post-retirement, he was appointed to the Jammu & Kashmir accountability panel.

References 

1937 births
2007 deaths
Faculty of Law, Aligarh Muslim University alumni
Justices of the Supreme Court of India
20th-century Indian judges
University of Kashmir alumni